
The Dutch Bridge Federation is the national governing body for bridge in the Netherlands, based in Utrecht. Founded on 22 November 1930 by Infantry Colonel A. J. E. Lucardie, the federation is the second largest nation member of the European Bridge League, with a 2013 membership of 85,796.

Organisation

Board (bestuur)
President (voorzitter): Koos Vrieze
Vice-president (vicevoorzitter): Adry Janmaat-Uijtewaal, nominated in 2010 
Treasurer (penningmeester): Rob van Leeuwen

Bridgemate
Between 2000 and 2005 Dutchman Ron Bouwland, sponsored by the Dutch Bridge Federation, developed Bridgemate, an electronic bridge scoring device. The original Bridgemate is connected to a computer by cable, while its successor, Bridgemate II, uses a wireless connection. Within the Low Countries, Bridgemate is used by around 1,400 bridge clubs. The World Bridge Federation, the European Bridge League and the American Contract Bridge League also use the device in competitions.

See also

List of bridge federations
List of bridge competitions and awards

External links 
 Nederlandse Bridge Bond

References

Contract bridge governing bodies
Organisations based in Utrecht (city)
Sports governing bodies in the Netherlands
Contract bridge in the Netherlands